I Hear a Symphony is the sixteenth album led by saxophonist Hank Crawford and his fifth released on the Kudu label in 1975.

Reception

AllMusic awarded the album 3 stars and its review by Thom Jurek states, "this set is a cooker. Certainly the production is a bit dated, but the funky-butt moves in Crawford's soulful playing and the tough riffing of Gale more than transcend it".

Track listing
 "I Hear a Symphony" (Brian Holland, Lamont Dozier, Eddie Holland) – 4:46
 "Madison (Spirit, The Power)" (David Matthews) – 3:55
 "Hang it on the Ceiling" (Matthews) – 4:13
 "The Stripper" (David Rose) – 4:03
 "Sugar Free" (Hank Crawford) – 4:42
 "Love Won't Let Me Wait" (Vinnie Barrett, Bobby Eli) – 4:03
 "I'll Move You No Mountain" (Jerry Ragovoy, Aaron Schroeder) – 4:08
 "Baby! This Love I Have" (Minnie Riperton, Richard Rudolph, Leon Ware) – 3:38

Personnel 
Hank Crawford – alto saxophone
Jon Faddis, John Frosk, Robert Millikan, Alan Rubin – trumpet, flugelhorn
Barry Rogers, Fred Wesley – trombone
Paul Faulise, Tony Studd, Dave Taylor – bass trombone
Leon Pendarvis – electric piano 
Eric Gale – guitar
Gary King – bass
Steve Gadd – drums 
Ralph MacDonald – percussion
Idris Muhammad – shaker, tambourine
Patti Austin – lead vocals
Hilda Harris, Deborah McDuffie, Maeretha Stewart – vocals
Harry Cykman, Lewis Eley, Max Ellen, Paul Gershman, Emanuel Green, Harold Kohon, Charles Libove, Joe Malin, David Nadien, John Pintavalle, Raoul Poliakin, Max Pollikoff, Richard Sortomme – violin
Seymour Barab, Charles McCracken, Alan Shulman – cello
David Matthews – arranger

References 

1975 albums
Hank Crawford albums
Kudu Records albums
Albums produced by Creed Taylor
Albums arranged by David Matthews (keyboardist)
Albums recorded at Van Gelder Studio